PFL Everett was mixed martial arts event promoted by the Professional Fighters League that was held on July 29, 2017 at the Xfinity Arena in Everett, Washington.

Background
The event featured the organization's featherweight title fight between Andre Harrison and Steven Rodriguez before its belts were retired and vacated on June 7, 2018, when the PFL league format began at PFL 1. Subsequently, the PFL has crowned seasonal champions as an alternative to recognizing a single lineal champion

Bruno Santos was promoted to the main card to face Rex Harris after Shamil Gamzatov withdrew from the card due to injury. Tyler Vogel replaced Santos against Taylor. A welterweight fight between Magomed Magomedkerimov and Chris Cisneros due to illness was canceled after Magomedkerimov withdrew due to illness.

Results

See also
List of PFL events
List of PFL champions
List of current PFL fighters

References

Professional Fighters League
2017 in mixed martial arts